New York's 59th State Assembly district is one of the 150 districts in the New York State Assembly. It has been represented by Democrat Jaime Williams since 2016, replacing Roxanne Persaud.

Geography
District 59 is in Brooklyn, and encompasses portions of Canarsie, Georgetown, Plumb Beach, Mill Basin, Marine Park and Gerritsen Beach. Floyd Bennett Field is also located within the district.

Recent election results

2022

2020

2018

2016

2016 special

2014

2012

2010

References 

Politics of Brooklyn
59